Forum Robinsons, formerly called as Robinsons Place Pioneer, was a shopping mall located in Mandaluyong, Metro Manila, Philippines owned and operated by Robinsons Land. The mall opened on November 17, 2004. The former name Robinsons Place Pioneer was dubbed after its location, Pioneer Street. Back then, the mall was envisioned to become a one stop shop for everyone in Cybergate Complex which was in turn envisioned to become a cyberhub in the city. In 2010, the mall was renamed to its current name to re-position itself as a cyber lifestyle mall focusing on IT products and to align itself with the vision of the Cybergate Complex.

The mall closed on April 30, 2022, to give way for its redevelopment works, which was originally set to start on early 2020 but was delayed due to the COVID-19 pandemic in the Philippines. The new complex will feature office towers atop the new mall area.

See also
Robinsons Galleria

References

Shopping malls in Mandaluyong
Defunct shopping malls
Shopping malls established in 2004
Shopping malls disestablished in 2022
Robinsons Malls
2004 establishments in the Philippines
2022 disestablishments in the Philippines